Hoplocryptanthus is a genus of flowering plants belonging to the family Bromeliaceae. It was formerly treated as the subgenus Hoplocryptanthus of the genus Cryptanthus.

Its native range is Southeastern Brazil.

Species:
Hoplocryptanthus caracensis , syn. Cryptanthus caracensis
Hoplocryptanthus ferrarius , syn. Cryptanthus ferrarius
Hoplocryptanthus glaziovii , syn. Cryptanthus glaziovii
Hoplocryptanthus knegtianus 
Hoplocryptanthus lavrasensis , syn. Cryptanthus lavrasensis
Hoplocryptanthus regius , syn. Cryptanthus regius
Hoplocryptanthus schwackeanus , syn. Cryptanthus schwackeanus
Hoplocryptanthus tiradentesensis , syn. Cryptanthus tiradentesensis
Hoplocryptanthus vidaliorum

References

Bromelioideae
Bromeliaceae genera